Molbishcha is a rural locality (a village) in Mayskoye Rural Settlement, Vologodsky District, Vologda Oblast, Russia. The population was 10 as of 2002.

Geography 
Molbishcha is located 18 km northwest of Vologda (the district's administrative centre) by road. Abakshino is the nearest rural locality.

References 

Rural localities in Vologodsky District